Curelius is a genus of silken fungus beetles in the family Cryptophagidae. There are at least two described species in Curelius.

Species
These two species belong to the genus Curelius:
 Curelius exiguus (Erichson, 1846)
 Curelius japonicus (Reitter, 1877)

References

Further reading

 
 

Cryptophagidae
Articles created by Qbugbot